The Men's 20 kilometre individual biathlon competition at the 1980 Winter Olympics was held on 16 February, at Lake Placid Olympic Sports Complex Cross Country Biathlon Center.  Each miss of the target cost two minutes, while hitting the outer circle cost one minute.

Results 

Anatoly Alyabyev had never had a major result on the international scene, but had a great debut at Lake Placid. He had only the 10th best ski time, but won as a result of shooting clear, the only man in the field to do so. Frank Ullrich had a spectacular ski performance, having the best time by more than 30 seconds, meaning his three penalties still left in him silver medal position. Eberhard Rösch took bronze with just two minutes in penalties; only Alyabyev skied under 1 hour 10 with less. World champion Klaus Siebert had a good ski time, but faced 6 minutes in penalties, and ended up 15th.

References

Individual